Tsuneharu is a masculine Japanese given name.

Possible writings
Tsuneharu can be written using different combinations of kanji characters. Here are some examples:

常治, "usual, to manage"
常春, "usual, spring"
常温, "usual, to warm up"
常晴, "usual, clear (weather)"
恒治, "always, to manage"
恒春, "always, spring"
恒温, "always, to warm up"
恒晴, "always, clear (weather)"
庸治, "common, to manage"
庸春, "common, spring"
庸温, "common, to warm up"
庸晴, "common, clear (weather)"
毎治, "every, to manage"
毎春, "every, spring"
毎温, "every, to warm up"
毎晴, "every, clear (weather)"

The name can also be written in hiragana つねはる or katakana ツネハル.

Notable people with the name
Tsuneharu Endo (遠藤 常春, 1667–1689), Japanese samurai.
Tsuneharu Ogasawara (小笠原 常春, 1666–1747), Japanese archer.
, Japanese sport wrestler.
, Japanese prince and diplomat.

Japanese masculine given names